Robert Hornmede (died 1409), of Guildford, Surrey, was an English politician.

He was a Member (MP) of the Parliament of England for Guildford in 1401. Nothing is recorded of his family or any other offices he may have held.

References

14th-century births
1409 deaths
English MPs 1401
Members of Parliament for Guildford